A videophile (literally, "one who loves sight") is one who is concerned with achieving high-quality results in the recording and playback of movies, TV programs, etc.

Criteria
Similar to audiophile values, videophile values may be applied at all stages of the chain: the initial audio-visual recording, the video production process, and the playback (usually in a home setting).
Some of the aspects of video that most videophiles are concerned with include frame rate, color system, resolution, compression artifacts, motion artifacts, video noise, screen size, etc.

Origin
The term "videophile" was popularised, if not coined, by Tallahassee, Florida-based attorney and writer Jim Lowe, editor and publisher of The Videophile's Newsletter, the first issue of which appeared in the summer of 1976. This was the first publication to unite fans of the Sony Betamax home video recorder (and later VHS, introduced in 1977). The newsletter later became The Videophile, a nationally distributed magazine, the last issue of which was published in 1981.

See also
Audiophile
Broadcast quality
Professional audio

References

Film and video technology
Digital television
High-definition television
Hobbies